Maurice Bertel (1871 – 17 May, 1930) was a French-born cinematographer who worked mostly in Australia. He moved to Australia in 1890 and learned his trade with local film companies. From 1907 he supervised the weekly newsreel made by Pathe Freres in Melbourne, staying with them for a number of months when they merged with Australasian Films in 1913. He then went to work for Lincoln-Cass Films and J. C. Williamson Ltd on their feature films, before joining Herschell's in Melbourne as a technical adviser.

Filmography
The Sick Stockrider (1913)
Moondyne (1913)
The Remittance Man (1913)
Transported (1913)
The Road to Ruin (1913)
The Crisis (1913)
The Reprieve (1913)
The Wreck (1913)

References

External links
Maurice Bertel at National Film and Sound Archive

Australian cinematographers
1871 births
1930 deaths
Australian film studio executives
French emigrants to Australia